Tero Karhu (born 28 September 1979) is a Finnish sport journalist and former footballer who represented FC Viikingit of the Finnish First Division. He usually played as a central midfielder.

Nowadays, Karhu hosts Finnish Premier Division match previews and half time studio broadcasts on Ruutu+. He has also announced football on Canal+ and MTV3. Karhu worked for Finnish broadcasting company Yle in FIFA World Cup 2014 and UEFA Euro 2016.

During a spell in England, Tero played for Billericay Town and Waltham Forest.

References

1979 births
Living people
Footballers from Helsinki
Finnish footballers
Association football midfielders
Veikkausliiga players